Dubos is a French surname. Notable people with the surname include:

Jean-Baptiste Dubos (1670–1742), French writer
Jean-François Dubos (born 1945), French businessman
René Dubos (1901–1982), American scientist

See also
 Charles Du Bos (1882–1939), French essayist and critic
 Marie-Jeanne Renard du Bos (1700 – between 1730 and 1750), French engraver
 Dubois (disambiguation)
 DuBose (disambiguation)

French-language surnames